Boyle County Schools is a school district located in Boyle County, Kentucky. The district is coterminous with the boundaries of the Boyle County except for the city of Danville, which has its own school district (Danville Schools). It comprises three elementary schools, one middle school, and one high school and provides educational programs for about 2600 students.

Schools
Source (2018–19): National Center for Education Statistics
High school
 Boyle County High School (9–12) 863 students
Middle school
 Boyle County Middle School (6–8) 640 students
Elementary schools
 Junction City Elementary (PK–5) 381 students
 Perryville Elementary (PK–5) 278 students
 Woodlawn Elementary (PK–5) 574 students

Board of Education
The Board of Education has five members. Each member serves a four-year term.
The current members of the Board of Education are:
 Jennifer Newby (Chairperson)
 Jesse Johnson (Vice-Chairperson)
 Ruth Ann Elliott
 Steve Tamme
 Laura Weddle

The superintendent is appointed by the Board and serves as secretary.  The current superintendent is Mike LaFavers.

References

External links
 
 Kentucky Department of Education (2010 archive)

Danville, Kentucky
School districts in Kentucky
Education in Boyle County, Kentucky